Mrs Annie Murdoch is a 1927 portrait painting by Australian artist George Washington Lambert. The painting depicts Annie Murdoch, the mother of newspaper proprietor Keith Murdoch and grandmother of businessman Rupert Murdoch. Murdoch commissioned this painting of his mother, who migrated to Australia from Scotland in 1884 with her Presbyterian minister husband, Patrick. Lambert painted the work in September 1927.

The painting was awarded the Archibald Prize in 1927. The painting remains part of the Murdoch family collection.

References

Paintings by George Washington Lambert
1927 paintings
Portraits by Australian artists
20th-century portraits
Murdoch family